Synarthrophyton is a genus of thalloid red algae comprising eight species. The monomerous, crustose thalli are composed of a single system of filaments which grow close to the underlying surface.  Synarthrophyton reproduces by means of flask-shaped multiporate conceptacles; it produces tetraspores and dispores.  Mucus plugs the opening of young conceptacles, which open as they mature.

Species 

The  valid species currently considered to belong to this genus are:
S. chejuensis
S. eckloniae
S. magellanicum
S. munimentum
S. patena
S. robbenense
S. schielianum
S. schmitzii

References 

Corallinaceae
Red algae genera